Stop Look and Listen is a color, 10-minute 1967 comedy film written, produced, directed by, and starring Len Janson and Chuck Menville. The film was nominated for an Oscar in 1968 (Best Short Subject, Live Action).

Technique
It was mostly filmed in San Fernando Valley in pixilation (stop-motion photography).

Summary
The film generates comedy by contrasting the safe and dangerous styles of two drivers who drive in the way made famous by Harold Lloyd: by sitting in the street and seeming to move their bodies as though they were automobiles.

See also
List of American films of 1967

References

External links 
 
 
 BFI

1967 films
1967 comedy films
1967 short films
Animated films without speech
Films without speech
1960s stop-motion animated films
1967 animated films
Pixilation films
American comedy short films
1960s English-language films